Pressing may refer to:
Pressing (association football), a defensive tactic
Pressing (execution), a method of killing by crushing
Pressing (metalworking), also known as stamping, a manufacturing process 
Pressing (wine), the extraction of juice from crushed grapes during wine making
Expeller pressing or oil pressing, a mechanical method for extracting oil from raw materials
Full-court press, a defensive tactic in basketball
Hohe Pressing, a hill in the Central Eastern Alps, Austria
Hot pressing, a powder metallurgy process
Hot isostatic pressing, a manufacturing process
Plant pressing, a botanical collection technique
Pressing plant, a machine for producing vinyl sound recordings
Presing, a Serbian band also known as Pressing

See also
Press (disambiguation)